Oscar Petter Johansson (born May 11, 1988) is a Swedish professional ice hockey winger, currently playing for Borås HC in the HockeyAllsvenskan.

Career statistics

Regular season and playoffs

References

External links

1988 births
Living people
Borås HC players
IF Sundsvall Hockey players
Swedish ice hockey left wingers
Timrå IK players
People from Karlshamn
Sportspeople from Blekinge County